OpenWeatherMap is an online service, owned by OpenWeather Ltd, that provides global weather data via API, including current weather data, forecasts, nowcasts and historical weather data for any geographical location. The company provides a minute-by-minute hyperlocal precipitation forecast for any location. The convolutional machine learning model is used to utilise meteorological broadcast services and data from airport weather stations, on-ground radar stations, weather satellites, remote sensing satellites, METAR and automated weather stations.

The company has more than 2 million customers, ranging from independent developers to Fortune 500 companies.

The variety of weather APIs provided by OpenWeatherMap have found a significant popularity among the software developers, which resulted in the growing multitude of repositories on GitHub. The APIs support multiple languages, units of measurement and industry standard data formats like JSON and XML.

In 2021, OpenWeatherMap launched a number of initiatives to support students, researchers and developers across the world.

Products and services 

OpenWeatherMap provides a range of weather-related products in a variable combination of depth and steps of measurement to millions of clients globally. The product range includes current, historical and forecasted weather data with the granularity as high as 1 minute. The length of the nowcast reaches 2 hours, short-term forecast reaches 16 days and long-term forecast can reach up to 1 year length. Historical weather data goes over 40 years deep. OpenWeather also provides a range of weather maps and weather alert services.
 
In 2015, Google chose OpenWeatherMap as a weather data provider for its bid-by-weather script in Google Ads, that serves the ads based on the local weather conditions, such as temperature, humidity, and cloudiness. Same year, Google published documentation on how to use OpenWeather data to display weather conditions on Google Maps.

In 2020, Samsung included OpenWeatherMap into their Galaxy Watch Studio as a weather data provider for those willing to develop applications for Galaxy Watch.

In 2020, OpenWeatherMap has released its weather application for iOS and Android.

OpenWeather provides data for weather risk management on the individual agreement basis to the industries like energy, agriculture, transportation, construction, municipalities, travel, food processors, retail sales and real estate. OpenWeather also operates under the terms of Creative Commons Attribution-ShareAlike license providing free access to the APIs that include current weather, a minutely forecast for 1 hour, hourly forecast for 48 days, 3-hour forecast for 5 days, daily forecast for 7 days, short-term history, weather maps, alerts, geocoding, air quality weather triggers and weather widgets.

Competitors 

 AccuWeather
 Weather Underground
 ClimaCell
 DarkSky (API no longer available after being bought by Apple)

References

External links 
 
 
 



Meteorological companies
Meteorological data and networks